The Nanning–Kunming railway, or Nankun railway, is a single-track electrified railway in Southwest China between Nanning and Kunming, provincial capitals, respectively, of Guangxi Zhuang Autonomous Region and Yunnan Province. The Nankun Railway is a major rail conduit in Southwest China. Major cities and towns along route include Nanning, Baise, Xingyi, Luoping and Kunming.

The Qingshuihe Railway Bridge (Qingshui River Railway Bridge) carries the railway across the deep gorge of the Quigshui River. It is one of the highest bridges in the world and the fifth-highest railway bridge. The bridge opened in 2000.

The Nanning–Kunming railway provides the shortest railway connection between Yunnan Province and China's sea ports on the  Tonkin Gulf, such as Fangchenggang and Beihai, thus playing a role somewhat similar to that played by the Kunming–Hai Phong railway before World War II.

Rail connections
Nanning: Hunan–Guangxi railway
Tiandong: the Tiandong-Debao branch (open 2010), primarily used by the bauxite mining industry.
 Weishe (Xingyi): Weishe–Hongguo railway
Kunming: Shanghai–Kunming railway / Neijiang–Kunming railway, Chengdu–Kunming railway

See also

 Nanning–Kunming high-speed railway
 List of railways in China

References

Railway lines in China
Rail transport in Guangxi
Rail transport in Guizhou
Rail transport in Yunnan
Xingyi, Guizhou